Rim Riahi (born 17 February 1970), is a Tunisian actor. She is best known for the role 'Hanène Lahmar' in the television serial Naouret El Hawa.

Personal life
She was born on 17 February 1977 in Tunisia. She was married to Tunisian director Madih Belaïd where the couple has three children.

Career
In 1997 she started acting career with the television serial El Khottab Al Bab in which she played the role 'Raoudha'. With the success of the serial, she was selected for the 1998 film Moon Wedding directed by Taïeb Louhichi. Then in 1999, she appeared in the television serial Ghalia directed by Moncef El Kateb.

At the beginning of new millennium, she received a lead role in the television screen, where she played the role 'Lilia Mardoum-Srairi' in the popular television serial Gamret Sidi Mahrous directed by Slaheddine Essid in 2002. In 2006, she played the role of 'Zohra' in Mohamed Ghodhbane's serial Hayet Wa Amani.

In 2014, she starred in the television serial Naouret El Hawa, directed by her husband Belaïd. The series became very popular and she received the award for Best Actress for her role as 'Hanène Lahmar' in the serial Naouret El Hawa in that year. She won the Ramadan Star Award at the Romdhane Awards awarded by Mosaïque FM.

Filmography
 1998: Moon Wedding, by Taïeb Louhichi
 2006: Ellombara, by Ali Abidi
 2010: The Last Hour, by Ali Abidi

Television serials 
 1997: El Khottab Al Bab (season 2), by Slaheddine Essid : Raoudha
 1999: Ghalia, by Moncef El Kateb
 2002: Gamret Sidi Mahrous, by Slaheddine Essid
 2005: Mal Wa Amal, by Abdelkader Jerbi
 2006: Hayet Wa Amani, by Mohamed Ghodhbane 
 2010: Njoum Ellil (season 2), by Madih Belaïd
 2014–2015: Naouret El Hawa, by Madih Belaïd
 2016: Al Akaber, by Madih Belaïd
 2020: Nouba by Abdelhamid Bouchnak
 2021: Machair by Miuhammet Gök : Rym

References

External links
 

Living people
Tunisian film actresses
1977 births
Tunisian television actresses